Garampani Wildlife Sanctuary is a  wildlife sanctuary located in Karbi Anglong district, Assam, India.

The nearest Airport is Dimapur which is 55 km away, and Jorhat Airport is 85 km away. The road distances from nearest towns: 35 km from Golaghat, 92 km from Diphu, 330 km from Guwahati and 45 km from Kaziranga. 

It is one of the oldest sanctuaries containing hot water spring and waterfalls, and has a rich biodiversity. It is surrounded by Nambor Sanctuary having 51 rare species of orchid. Many rare birds can be seen here. It is home to hoolock gibbons and golden langurs.

The climate is tropical and the vegetation is mostly semi-evergreen and tropical.

The best time to visit is from November to April.

References

External links
 About Garampani Wildlife Sanctuary
 Department of Tourism, Government of Assam

Wildlife sanctuaries in Assam
Karbi Anglong district
Protected areas with year of establishment missing